Glen Allan Pettigrove is an American philosopher and Chair of Moral Philosophy at the University of Glasgow. He is known for his expertise on philosophy of emotions.

Career
Pettigrove has taught at the University of Auckland (2008-2017), Massey University (2005-2008) and Santa Clara University  (2003–2005).

Books
 Forgiveness and Love, Oxford University Press, 2012,

See also
Philosophy of love
Forgiveness

References

External links
Glen Pettigrove at the University of Glasgow

21st-century American philosophers
Philosophy academics
Living people
Academics of the University of Glasgow
Political philosophers
Academic staff of the University of Auckland
Academic staff of the Massey University
Santa Clara University faculty
University of California, Riverside alumni
Year of birth missing (living people)
Place of birth missing (living people)
University of Michigan alumni
Gordon–Conwell Theological Seminary alumni
Moral psychologists
New Zealand philosophers